Refuge is a place or state of safety.  It may also refer to a more specific meaning:

Safety
 Area of refuge, a location in a building that may be used by occupants in the event of a fire
 Bunker, a defensive fortification designed to protect people from bombs or other attacks
 Mountain hut, a shelter for travelers in mountainous areas, often remote
 Women's refuge, another term for women's shelter
 Refuge (United Kingdom charity), a British charity for female victims of domestic violence
 A place intended to shelter cultural property, in the context of the Hague Convention for the Protection of Cultural Property in the Event of Armed Conflict
 Right of asylum, protection of a person persecuted for political or religious beliefs by another sovereign authority

Nature and biology
 Wildlife refuge, a sanctuary or protected area for wildlife
 Refuge (ecology), a place where an organism can escape from predation
 Refugium (population biology), a location of an isolated or relict population of a previously more widespread species
 Refuge crop, a non-genetically modified food crop planted alongside a genetically modified one to prevent or slow the development of predators resistant to its modified properties by purposely encouraging the mating of species across said crops

Film and television 
 Refuge (1923 film), an American silent drama film
 Refuge (1928 film) or Escape, a German silent film
 The Refuge (film), a 2009 French drama directed by François Ozon
 Refuge (2012 film), an American drama directed by Jessica Goldberg
 Refuge: Stories of the Selfhelp Home, a 2012 American documentary by Ethan Bensinger
 "Refuge" (Law & Order), a television episode
 "The Refuge" (The Outer Limits), a television episode

Literature 
 The Refuge (novel), a 1954 novel by Kenneth Mackenzie
 Refuge: An Unnatural History of Family and Place, a 1991 book by Terry Tempest Williams
 Isaac Asimov's Robot City: Refuge, a 1988 novel by Rob Chilson

Music 
 Refuge (band), a side project of the German band Rage
 Refuge Records, a 1980s American record label
 Refuge (EP) or the title song, by Rage, 1994
 Refuge (Sons of Korah album), by Sons of Korah, 2014
 , by Carbon Based Lifeforms, 2013
 "Refuge", a song by Psy from 4X2=8, 2017
 "Refuge", a song by Steve Wilson from To the Bone, 2017

Other uses 
 Refuge, Mississippi
 Refuge, Texas, an unincorporated community in Houston County, Texas
 Eustache de Refuge (1564–1617), Early Modern French courtier, statesman and author
 A controversial evangelical Christian, "ex-gay" conversion therapy program for homosexual teenagers run by Love In Action
 Refuge (Buddhism), the basis of being a Buddhist

See also 
 Refugium (disambiguation)
 Refugee (disambiguation)
 City of Refuge (disambiguation)